The lokanga bara (sometimes referred to by the generic term lokanga) is a three-stringed fiddle popular among the Southern Antandroy and Bara ethnic groups of Madagascar.

The related term lokanga bazaha ("foreign lokanga") is used to refer to the European violin.

References

Malagasy musical instruments
String instruments
Bowed instruments